Tipasa  is a genus of moths of the family Erebidae. The genus was erected by Francis Walker in 1863.

Species
Tipasa aurata Hampson, 1926 New Guinea
Tipasa aurea (Bethune-Baker, 1908) New Guinea
Tipasa boopis Hampson, 1926 New Guinea
Tipasa eubapta Hampson, 1926 Borneo
Tipasa ilatana (Holland, 1900) Buru
Tipasa nebulosella Walker, 1863 Borneo
Tipasa omariusalis (Walker, 1859) Sri Lanka
Tipasa renalis (Moore, [1885]) Sri Lanka
Tipasa subrosea (Pagenstecher, 1900) Bismarck Archipelago

References

Calpinae
Noctuoidea genera